Tibric acid is a sulfamylbenzoic acid that acts as a hypolipidemic agent. Although it was found to be more powerful than clofibrate in lowering lipid levels, it was found to cause liver cancer in mice and rats, and so was not introduced as a human drug. In rats it causes an increase in peroxisomes, and liver enlargement, and then liver cancer. However the peroxisome changes do not occur in humans, and it is not likely to cause liver cancer in humans.

Synthesis
Tibric acid can be made in a multi-step process. Firstly 2-chlorobenzoic acid is reacted with chlorosulfonic acid to add chlorosulfonate group in the 5- position. This reacts with 3,5-dimethylpiperidine to yield tibric acid.

References

Hypolipidemic agents
Sulfonamides
Abandoned drugs
Benzoic acids